All About She are an English band from London, England. The band consists of record producers James Tadgell and Jon Clare, and singer Vanya Taylor. They were signed to Tinie Tempah's record label Disturbing London and have worked several times with him as well as other artists on the label. Tadgell and Clare, who have both previously worked with Devlin and Scorcher, wrote and produced "Intro", which opens Tinie Tempah's debut album Disc-Overy. Vanya provided vocals for Tinie's hit single "Simply Unstoppable" and Roska's song "Desire". Taylor has also performed backing vocals for Jessie J, and All About She created a remix of her single "It's My Party" for the deluxe edition of her second album, Alive. They also collaborated with Calvin Harris on a song from his fourth album, Motion (2014).

Music career

2013–present: Breakthrough
Their debut single "Bullet", featuring vocals from V V Brown, was released on 29 April 2013. The group's second single "Higher (Free)" was released on 29 November 2013, and entered the UK Singles Chart at number twenty and the UK Dance Chart at number five for the week ending 14 December 2013. They released a free six-track extended play titled Go Slow on 1 May 2014.

Since disbanding, group members James Tadgall & Jon Clare have rebranded as a duo & are now known as Yola Recoba.

Discography

Extended plays

Singles

As lead artist

As featured artist

Remixes

Production credits

References

2010 establishments in England
English electronic music groups
Musical groups established in 2010
Musical groups from London
British musical trios
Female-fronted musical groups
Remixers
UK garage groups
Atlantic Records artists